MedInfo  is the name of the international medical informatics conference organized initially every 3 years and now every other year by the International Medical Informatics Association. It is the most important international conference in the field with health and medical informatics professions attending from all over the world. MedInfo also serves to bring together all officers of the International Medical Informatics Association (IMIA) Board together with national representatives in the General Assembly of IMIA.

The General Assembly elects the officers of IMIA. The IMIA Board consists of the President (the Past or the Elect President), Treasurer and Secretary as its officers. In addition it has other Vice Presidents for targeted areas: Membership, MedInfo, Services, Special Affairs, Strategic Plan Implementation, and Working Groups. With the exception of the President and the Vice President of MedInfo all officers serve a three-year term that can be extended for a second three-year term.  The President and Vice President are on a two - year term and the Vice President of MedInfo has one 2-year term and elected the year before the next Medinfo meeting so that he/she can be mentored through one MedInfo cycle.

MedInfo conferences 
MedInfo was held every 3 years since its inception in 1974, after 2013 it is now held every two years.  The table below gives an overview of these conferences.

Other definitions 
MedInfo is also an acronym for Medical Informatics

See also 
 International Medical Informatics Association

References

External links 
 MedInfo 2021 Proceedings - https://ebooks.iospress.nl/ISBN/978-1-64368-265-5 
 MedInfo 2019 Proceedings - https://ebooks.iospress.nl/volume/medinfo-2019-health-and-wellbeing-e-networks-for-all-proceedings-of-the-17th-world-congress-on-medical-and-health-informatics 
 MedInfo 2017 Proceedings - https://ebooks.iospress.nl/volume/medinfo-2019-health-and-wellbeing-e-networks-for-all-proceedings-of-the-17th-world-congress-on-medical-and-health-informatics 
 MedInfo 2015 Proceedings - https://ebooks.iospress.nl/volume/medinfo-2015-ehealth-enabled-health-proceedings-of-the-15th-world-congress-on-health-and-biomedical-informatics
 Medinfo 2013 Proceedings - https://ebooks.iospress.nl/volume/medinfo-2013-proceedings-of-the-14th-world-congress-on-medical-and-health-informatics
 MedInfo 2010 Proceedings - https://ebooks.iospress.nl/volume/medinfo-2010
 MedInfo 2007 Proceedings - https://ebooks.iospress.nl/volume/medinfo-2007
 MedInfo 2004 Proceedings - https://ebooks.iospress.nl/volume/medinfo-2004 
 MedInfo 2001 Proceedings - https://ebooks.iospress.nl/volume/medinfo-2001
 MedInfo’98 Proceedings - https://ebooks.iospress.nl/volume/medinfo-98-9th-world-congress-on-medical-informatics 

Health informatics
Health informatics and eHealth associations